Toru Shimizu from the Renesas Electronics Corp., Tokyo, Japan, was named Fellow of the Institute of Electrical and Electronics Engineers (IEEE) in 2014 for development of integrated multi-core microprocessors with large memories.

References

Fellow Members of the IEEE
Living people
Year of birth missing (living people)
Place of birth missing (living people)